The Poisoned Kiss, or The Empress and the Necromancer is an opera in three acts by the English composer Ralph Vaughan Williams. The libretto, by Evelyn Sharp, is based on Richard Garnett's The Poison Maid and Nathaniel Hawthorne's 1844 short story Rappaccini's Daughter. The opera was completed in 1929, first performed by the Intimate Opera Company at the Cambridge Arts Theatre, United Kingdom, on 12 May 1936 (conducted by Cyril Rootham), and premiered in the United States on April 21, 1937 by the Juilliard Opera Theatre at the Juilliard School's theatre on Claremont Ave. The cast included Annamary Dickey as Angelica, Marvel Biddle as Tormentilla, Glenn Darwin as Gallanthus, Mary Frances Lehnerts as the Empress, David Otto as Dipsacus, Albert Gifford  as Amaryllus, and Signe Gulbrandsen and Athena Pappas as the mediums.

The Bronx Opera staged the work in January 2012.

Roles

References

Notes

Sources 
Holden, Amanda (Ed.), The New Penguin Opera Guide, New York: Penguin Putnam, 2001. 

Operas by Ralph Vaughan Williams
English-language operas
1936 operas
Operas